The deputy premier of Prince Edward Island is an office that was created on January 13, 2010, with the appointment of its first occupier George Webster, by Premier Robert Ghiz. Webster continued in this post under Premier Wade MacLauchlan, from February 23, 2015, to May 20, 2015. 

On May 9, 2019, Darlene Compton was named deputy premier, under Premier Dennis King.

References

See also
 Premier (Canada)
 List of Prince Edward Island premiers
 Executive Council of Prince Edward Island

Politics of Prince Edward Island